In the mathematical area of game theory, a minimax theorem is a theorem providing conditions that guarantee that the max–min inequality is also an equality. 
The first theorem in this sense is von Neumann's minimax theorem about zero-sum games published in 1928, which was considered the starting point of game theory. Von Neumann is quoted as saying "As far as I can see, there could be no theory of games ... without that theorem ... I thought there was nothing worth publishing until the Minimax Theorem was proved". 
Since then, several generalizations and alternative versions of von Neumann's original theorem have appeared in the literature.
Formally, von Neumann's minimax theorem states:

Let  and  be compact convex sets. If  is a continuous function that is concave-convex, i.e.

  is concave for fixed , and
  is convex for fixed .

Then we have that

Special case: Bilinear function
The theorem holds in particular if  is a linear function in both of its arguments (and therefore is bilinear) since a linear function is both concave and convex. Thus, if  for a finite matrix , we have:

 
The bilinear special case is particularly important for zero-sum games, when the strategy set of each player consists of lotteries over actions (mixed strategies), and payoffs are induced by expected value. In the above formulation,  is the payoff matrix.

See also 
 Sion's minimax theorem
 Parthasarathy's theorem — a generalization of  Von Neumann's minimax theorem
 Dual linear program can be used to prove the minimax theorem for zero-sum games.
 Yao's minimax principle

References 

Game theory
Mathematical optimization
Mathematical theorems